Agate Lake is a reservoir located  above sea level in Jackson County, Oregon, United States.
just north of Roxy Ann Peak.

History
Construction of Agate Dam was authorized in 1962, started in 1965, and completed in 1966.
Two canals were also built, one a feeder canal diverting seasonal runoff water from Hopkins canal fed from nearby Antelope Creek. The second is the Dry Creek Diversion Canal through which the reservoir water is released at a controlled rate beginning in the summer months supplementing the water supplies of Dry Creek, Antelope Creek, and eventually Little Butte Creek. This water is mainly used for irrigation and the demand for it downstream is normally enough to reduce the reservoir to its minimum allowable level by September each year. A boat ramp, four pit toilets, a picnic area, and a parking lot were also built. All but the boat ramp and parking lot have been removed due to excessive vandalism. There are three parking areas one on the north west side and two on the east side of the lake .

Statistics

Flora and fauna

Dry Creek was intermittent prior to the construction of Agate Dam, and did not have any significant fish population. Upstream (to the south of Agate Lake) trees such as willows, cottonwoods, and alders grow in Dry Creek's riparian zone. To the north of Agate Lake blackberries, willows, alders, madrones, white oaks, and ponderosa pine inhabit this zone.

Vegetation on the west side of the lake is mostly oak savanna, with many white oak and madrone trees. The most commons shrubs include buckbrush and occasionally poison oak. The south side consists of mainly grassland. Invasive species such as star thistle, cheat grass, and teasel have invaded these areas. To the northwest is more grassland, featuring vernal pools in the spring. When filled, the pools are a known habitat for a threatened species of fairy shrimp, (branchinecta lynchi), which can be found in the winter and early spring. The rare big-flowered woolly meadowfoam can also be found in these pools. They are endemic to the Agate Desert region.

Black-tailed deer inhabit the area in the spring, summer, and fall. Over 190 species of birds have been spotted around the lake.
Fish such as largemouth bass, smallmouth bass,  bluegill, catfish,  and crappie live in the lake.

Recreation

Only non motorized and electric motor boats are allowed on the Lake. Swimming, angling, rock hunting and picnicking are also popular activities.
In the late summer and early fall when the lake recedes you can find agates and petrified wood.

The Jackson County Parks Department estimates that approximately 5,000 people visit the lake annually.

Note list

See also
 List of lakes in Oregon

References

External links

Reservoirs in Oregon
Lakes of Jackson County, Oregon
Buildings and structures in Jackson County, Oregon
Protected areas of Jackson County, Oregon
Dams in Oregon
United States Bureau of Reclamation dams
Dams completed in 1966
1966 establishments in Oregon